The 2016–17 Ukrainian Junior Under 19 Championship was an inaugural season of the Ukrainian Junior Under 19 Championship in First League. The competition involved participation of several junior teams of the Professional Football League of Ukraine as well as some other football academies.

Direct administration of the competition belonged to the Youth Football League of Ukraine. The tournament was conducted in cooperation between both Youth Football League and Professional Football League.

Group stage

Group 1

Top goalscorers

Group 2

Top goalscorers

Wild card stage

''UFC Olimpik Kharkiv and FC Barsa Sumy qualified for the Final stage.

Final group
The final stage was taking place in village Polyana, Svalyava Raion in Zakarpattia.

See also
2016–17 Ukrainian First League
2016–17 Ukrainian Second League

References

External links
 Season's regulations at the Youth Football League of Ukraine
 Gold Talant, general information on all youth competitions in Ukraine
 Ukrainian Championship Under-19. First League. Awards has found their heroes (Чемпіонат України U-19. Перша ліга. Нагороди знайшли своїх героїв). Amsport. 12 June 2017

First League
Junior Championship First League